Home Delivery: Aapko... Ghar Tak is a 2005 Indian comedy film starring Vivek Oberoi, Ayesha Takia, Mahima Chaudhry, and Boman Irani in the lead roles.  The film also stars Abhishek Bachchan and Riteish Deshmukh in cameos. It is written and directed by Sujoy Ghosh and produced by Shabbir Boxwala. The film received negative reviews, with criticism aimed at the unoriginal plot, humor, direction and the acting, although the visual effects, soundtrack and the performances of Oberoi and Irani were praised.

Plot
Home Delivery is the story of how it takes just a single day to change a person's outlook on life forever. Sunny Chopra (Vivek Oberoi) is a 28-year-old writer who has carved a name for himself as a popular agony uncle, named Gyan Guru, writing for the Times of Hindustan. Sunny also managed to bag a prestigious screenplay writing project for the most happening film director, Karan Johar. A bit of a cynic, he believes he is a self-made man and that whatever he has achieved in life is due to his own hard work and nobody else's. His cynicism is extended to his views about marriage to his fiancée Jenny (Ayesha Takia) and to the festival of Diwali too.

Just as Sunny is cynical about life, Michael Burnett (Boman Irani) is optimistic about it. 51-year-old Michael is a simple-minded man, almost childlike and has recently landed job as a pizza delivery boy at Mummy's Pizza. Michael has sort of an inclination to lose every job he has ever had in two days flat. This time, however, he vows to keep this one no matter what.

On the eve of Diwali, Sunny has loads of stuff to do and very little time to do it. He has to meet his screenplay deadline, he has to get rid of Pandey (Saurabh Shukla), his irritatingly intrusive next door neighbor, and he's got to avoid his editor's telephone calls who is livid that he's bunking work. But more importantly he needs to get Jenny out of the way because he has a date with Maya (Mahima Chaudhry), a South Indian superstar who he has been in love with since as long as he can remember. In this confusion, Sunny forgets that there is no food in his bachelor pad and orders a pizza that Michael is given the task of delivering. And what Michael delivers to Sunny is so much more than just a pizza. Sunny is home delivered life's simple lessons – right to his doorstep.

Cast

Cameo appearances

Soundtrack

References

External links
 

2005 films
2000s Hindi-language films
2005 comedy films
Indian romantic comedy films
Films scored by Vishal–Shekhar
Films with screenplays by Ritesh Shah
Films directed by Sujoy Ghosh